"Stitch by Stitch" is the winner's song of the first ever American The Voice by Javier Colon, the winner of the first season of the show.

Promotion
Colon performed it on the finals of the show on June 28, 2011 and it was released immediately following the end of the show. Colon was declared the winner on the basis of this "original song" on the final results show on June 29, 2011. "Stitch by Stitch" debuted at number 17 on the Billboard Hot 100. On July 7, 2011 Colon performed "Stitch by Stitch" on The Tonight Show with Jay Leno.

Commercial performance
In its first week of release, the song sold 145,000 copies, debuting and peaking at #17 on the US Billboard Hot 100 chart. A week later the song fell to #96. It was the biggest single-week downward movement on the Hot 100 until "Move Ya Hips" by ASAP Ferg surpassed it by dropping 80 positions on the chart from #19 to #99 in August 2020.

Charts

References

External links
iTunes: Stitch by Stitch (The Voice Performance) page

2011 singles
Javier Colon songs
Songs written by Dave Bassett (songwriter)
Songs written by David Hodges
Songs written by Lindy Robbins
Song recordings produced by Rodney Jerkins
Universal Republic Records singles
2011 songs